Kapingamarangi is an atoll and a municipality in the state of Pohnpei of the Federated States of Micronesia.

Out of this,  is land area, spread over 33 wooded islets on the eastern side of the atoll, three of which host the population of about 500 people. The western reef rim of the atoll is almost submerged at high water.

Kapingamarangi is the southernmost point of Micronesia.

Population

Kapingamarangi has a population of about 500. Several hundred Kapingamarangi people also live in Porakied village in Pohnpei. Their language is Polynesian. The main industry is fishing.

Most of the population resides on these two islets, plus the remnant on Taringa (south of Touhou), although many of the remaining islets are used for growing fruit and vegetables.

History

The first recorded sighting by Europeans was by the Spanish expedition of Hernando de Grijalva in 1537, who charted it as Los Pescadores (Island of the Fishermen in Spanish, not to be confused with Pescadores Islands). This discovery was referred by a contemporary, the Portuguese António Galvão, governor of Ternate, in his book Tratado dos Descobrimentos of 1563.

In the 19th century it was charted as Greenwich and Pikaram by the English, and Constantine by the French. The first European ship entered the lagoon and established direct contact with the islanders in 1877. When the Japanese empire assumed control of Micronesia from the German empire in 1914, shipping, trade, and travel became more common to the islanders.

The island was attacked by U.S. Navy long-range bombers during World War II. Two Japanese ships are listed on a wreck diving website.

Climate
Kapingamarangi has a tropical rainforest climate (Af) with heavy rainfall year-round.

Spanish claims 
During the dispute for the Carolines between Germany and Spain in 1885, arbitrated by Pope Leo XIII, the sovereignty of Spain over the Caroline and Palau islands as part of the Spanish East Indies was analyzed by a commission of cardinals and confirmed by an agreement signed on 17 December. Its Article 2 specifies the limits of Spanish sovereignty in South Micronesia, being formed by the Equator and 11°N Latitude and by 133° and 164° Longitude. In 1899, Spain sold the Marianas, Carolinas and Palaus to Germany after its defeat in 1898 in the Spanish–American War. However Emilio Pastor Santos, a researcher of the Spanish National Research Council, claimed in 1948 that there was historical basis, supported by the charts and maps of the time, to argue that Kapingamarangi and some other islands had never been considered part of the Carolines. Thus Kapingamarangi was not included in the description of the territory transferred to Germany, and therefore was not affected on the part of Spain to any cessation of transfer and theoretically Spain should have the only jurisdiction and right to this island.

Pastor Santos presented his thesis to the Spanish government in 1948. In the Council of Ministers of Spain on 12 January 1949, the Minister of Foreign Affairs declared on this proposal that it had passed to the first stage of public attention. The Cabinet of Diplomatic Information of the Ministry of Foreign Affairs circulated the following note:

The Minister of Foreign Affairs informed the Council of Ministers of the situation in which we find ourselves in view of information and public commentary in the press and because of the requests made of the Spanish administration. The Ministry recognizes that it is a certain fact and historic truth due to Article 3 of the Treaty of July 1, 1899, that Spain reserved a series of rights in Micronesia and for another thing, the specifications of the territories which Spain ceded in 1899 leaves apart certain groups of islands in the same zone.

However, no Spanish government has made any attempt in this respect, and this case remains as a historical curiosity related to Kapingamarangi.

Help missions 
Kapingamarangi has received some help missions from the European Union. The most important one was in 2019, when the European Union Coperation Delegation in the Pacific, invested 14 months installing big water tanks in some parts of the atoll.

Some years ago Readiness for El Niño (RENI) project promoted by the European Union, offered 4.5 million euros, together with the Pacific Community, which implemented it with the governments of the Federated States of Micronesia developed this project focused on securing the food and water resources of the atoll. Also, but not as important as the previous ones, there are some organizations that have collaborated by helping the atol, such as the University of Oregon Micronesia and South Pacific Program, PTT Found and the Project Management Unit that is part of The Adaptation Fund.

See also 
Kapingamarangi language
Christmas Drop
Polynesian outliers
 Madolenihmw
 Kitti (municipality)
 U, Pohnpei
 Nett
 Sokehs
 Pingelap
 Sapwuahfik
 Nukuoro
 Mokil
 Kolonia
 Oroluk
 Palikir

References

Works cited

External links 

 Detailed Map of Kapingamarangi
 Kapingamarangi Health Report (1950)
 Monograph on reptiles of Kapingamarangi (1998)
 Kapingamarangi Canoe Building Project, Univ. of Oregon
Kapingamarangi and Nukuoro diving and science expedition 1969

Atolls of the Federated States of Micronesia
Municipalities of Pohnpei
Polynesian outliers
Territorial disputes of Spain